Guðrún Ýr Eyfjörð Jóhannesdóttir (born 8 January 1996), known by the stage name GDRN, is an Icelandic singer and actress. Much of her music is jazz-influenced pop. She won four awards at the 2018 Icelandic Music Awards (including as pop singer of the year) and was nominated for the 2018 Nordic Music Prize.

Biography

Early life
Born in Reykjavík, Guðrún moved to Mosfellsbær at the age of four.

Football career
Guðrún started playing football with Afturelding junior teams at the age of five. She had her first taste with the senior team in July 2011, at the age of 15, when she was an unused substitute in match against Þróttur Reykjavík in the Icelandic top-tier Úrvalsdeild kvenna. She suffered a cruciate ligament tear in 2011 and a meniscus tear in 2012 and while she managed to play 7 matches in the Úrvalsdeild the following seasons, the injuries effectively ended her career following the 2014 season. In April 2022, she signed a 3-year deal to become one of Afturelding women's team primary sponsors.

Music career
She studied classical violin for 11 years, and later jazz piano and singing. She went to Reykjavík Junior College with the intention of becoming a medical doctor, but began making music in her last year of junior college which she would then focus on after graduation.

She writes her own lyrics, and co-produces her music with Teitur Helgi Skúlason and Bjarki Sigurðsson or her first album, and with Arnar Ingi Ingason and Magnús Jóhann Ragnarsson on her second.

Her first hit song was "Lætur mig" from 2018.

Guðrún headlined at the 2019 Þjóðhátíð and was chosen as Mosfellsbær's artist of 2019.

In 2019 she was a part of the music cast of the National Theatre of Iceland's production of Shakespeare in Love.

In 2020 it was announced that she had been cast as a member of Netflix's Icelandic original series Katla, directed by Baltasar Kormákur. She plays the character of Gríma in the series.

Albums 
 Hvað ef (2018)
 GDRN (2020)
 Tíu íslensk sönglög (2022)

Awards and nominations

Filmography

Notes

References

External links
 
 

1996 births
Living people
Guðrún Ýr Eyfjörð
Women's association football forwards
Guðrún Ýr Eyfjörð
21st-century Icelandic women singers
Guðrún Ýr Eyfjörð